Chlamydoselachus is a genus of sharks and the sole extant member of the family Chlamydoselachidae, in the order Hexanchiformes. It contains two extant and several extinct species. The most widely known species still surviving is the frilled shark (Chlamydoselachus anguineus). It is known as a living fossil, along with Chlamydoselachus africana, also known as the southern African frilled shark, which is only found along coastal areas of South Africa. The only two extant species of this genus are deep-sea creatures which are typically weakened in areas closer to the surface.

Species
 Chlamydoselachus africana Ebert & Compagno, 2009 (southern African frilled shark)
 Chlamydoselachus anguineus Garman, 1884 (frilled shark) 
 †Chlamydoselachus bracheri Pfeil, 1983
 †Chlamydoselachus fiedleri Pfeil, 1983
 †Chlamydoselachus garmani Welton, 1983
 †Chlamydoselachus goliath Antunes & Cappetta, 2002
 †Chlamydoselachus gracilis Antunes & Cappetta, 2002
 †Chlamydoselachus keyesi Mannering & Hiller, 2008
 †Chlamydoselachus landinii Carrillo-Briceño, Aguilera & Rodriguez, 2014
 †Chlamydoselachus lawleyi Davis, 1887
 †Chlamydoselachus tatere Consoli, 2008
 †Chlamydoselachus thomsoni Richter & Ward, 1990
 †Chlamydoselachus tobleri Leriche, 1929

References

Chlamydoselachidae
Extant Campanian first appearances
Shark genera
Taxa named by Samuel Garman
Campanian genus first appearances